The East Capitol Car Barn, also known as The Car Barn Condominiums, is an historic building, located at 1400 East Capitol Street, Northeast, Washington, D.C., in the Capitol Hill neighborhood.

History
The Romanesque Revival building was designed by Waddy Butler Wood in 1896.
It was built as a part of the conversion of Streetcars in Washington, D.C. to electric traction. 
In 1962, it was used to store buses. 
In 1973, the DC Transit Company was acquired by Washington Metropolitan Area Transit Authority, and the building was vacant. 
A private developer purchased the property and developed it into condominiums. 

The building was added to the National Register of Historic Places on February 5, 1974.

References

External links
"Lost Capitol Hill: East Capitol Car Barn", April 26, 2010, Robert Pohl 
"BEYOND THE BOUNDARIES: From Rosedale to East Capitol Street, N.E."
Virtual Globe Trotting
http://www.dccondoboutique.com/car-barn.php
http://www.holladaycorp.com/pages/proj_carbarn.htm
https://www.flickr.com/photos/ncindc/2940371605/

Industrial buildings and structures on the National Register of Historic Places in Washington, D.C.
Romanesque Revival architecture in Washington, D.C.
Transport infrastructure completed in 1896
Capitol Hill